The University of Porto (Universidade do Porto) is a Portuguese public research university located in Porto, and founded on 22 March 1911. It is the second largest Portuguese university by number of enrolled students, after the University of Lisbon, and has one of the most noted research outputs in Portugal.

History
The University of Porto was founded by decree of 22 March 1911, issued by the Provisional Government of the First Portuguese Republic. While it is possible to point the university's predecessors as the Nautical Academy, established by King Joseph I in 1762, and the Drawing and Sketching Academy, created by Queen Mary I in 1779, the university was to be based primarily on higher education institutions created in the nineteenth century, namely the Polytechnic Academy (1836–1911) and Medical-Surgical Academy of Porto (1836–1911).

The Polytechnic Academy's main purpose was the teaching of science and industrial engineering of all kinds, and professional specialties such as naval officers, merchants, farmers, factory directors and artists. Heir to the Royal Navy and Commerce Academy of Porto, which was established in 1803 by Prince Regent John (future King John VI), it arose as a result of reforms implemented by Passos Manuel, Minister of the Kingdom in the Government that came out of the Revolution of September. Under this reform, the name of the academy was changed to the Royal Polytechnic Academy in 1837. However, the Royal Economic and Literary Academy, under the supervision of the board of directors of the General Company of Agriculture in the Alto Douro vineyards, was transferred to the Council of Lenses. Despite the great financial difficulties experienced during this period, the Polytechnic Academy of Porto underwent a time of great scientific activity, with eminent scientists such as Gomes Ferreira and Teixeira da Silva.

The inauguration of the University of Porto took place on 16 July 1911, and mathematician Gomes Teixeira was chosen as first Reitor (rector). At this time, the university became economically and scientifically independent, and teaching autonomy was officially recognized.

Currently, there are 14 faculties and a postgraduate business school at the university.

Research and development
R&D activities at the University of Porto have significantly expanded over the last years, mainly as a result of academic qualification and increased funding of R&D centers and concession of research grants through competitive programs with external independent evaluation by international peer review committees.

Although R&D centers vary noticeably in dimension, aims and structure – from small units to large centers, conducting specialized or interdisciplinary work, faculty integrated or independent –  they are present in almost every field of knowledge showing a shared vision towards a modern research-oriented university. Many of these centers are interface institutions whose aim is the development of links of cooperation between the university and external entities such as enterprises or governmental organizations. Among the most recognized research centers of the university are IBMC (Instituto de Biologia Molecular e Celular, Institute of Molecular and Cell Biology), IPATIMUP (Instituto de Patologia e Immunologia Molecular da Universidade do Porto, Institute of Molecular Pathology and Immunology of the University of Porto) and INESC-Porto (Instituto de Engenharia de Sistemas e Computadores, Research Institute of Computer Systems).

The University of Porto collaborates with many companies though its Parque da Ciencia e Tecnologia do Porto, a business incubator and business entrepreneur centre. Some companies included on these centre are: Nonius, Fan Valley or Veniam.

Rankings

The University of Porto is consistently ranked among the best Portuguese universities. 
It is among the top 100 universities in Europe, according to the Webometrics Ranking Web of Universities.

In 2018, the ARWU ranked the university in the category 301–400 best universities in the world.

In 2019, the QS World University Rankings ranked the university as 328th best in the world. QS puts the University of Porto at 51–100 in the subject rankings for Architecture, Chemical Engineering, Civil Engineering, and Sports Science.

Facilities
The university buildings – faculties, R&D centres, student residences and sport facilities – are grouped in three main sites (called ‘poles’). In the city centre – where the neoclassical building of architect Carlos Amarante marks the birthplace of the university – lies Pole 1; Pole 2 (Asprela) is a campus in the northern end of Porto; Pole 3 (Campo Alegre) is located in the western part of the city, over the river Douro bank, not far from Pole 1. A number of other institutes and centers are scattered all over the city and even beyond its limits.

Students
 

The students of the University of Porto organise several extra curricular events. In sports, those include the activities promoted within G.A.D.U.P. and C.D.U.P. In culture, the university recognizes as its cultural extension groups like Orfeão Universitário do Porto (choir, dance and music), Teatro Universitário do Porto (theatre), NEFUP (folklore), SDdUP (debates), CLUP (choir of the Faculty of Letters) and AAOUP (former Orfeão members).

The academic life offers major festivities, with events ranging from the Latada to the Queima das Fitas. This last event is organized in cooperation with FAP – Federação Académica do Porto and it is considered the biggest student festivity in Porto.

Organization
Today, about 28,000 students (11,000 postgraduate) attend the programmes and courses provided by the U.Porto's fifteen schools (13 faculties, a biomedical sciences institute and a business school, each one with a considerable degree of autonomy).

 Faculty of Architecture, FAUP
 Faculty of Dental Medicine, FMDUP
 Faculty of Economics, FEP
 Faculty of Engineering, FEUP
 Faculty of Fine Arts, FBAUP
 Faculty of Law, FDUP
 Faculty of Letters, FLUP
 Faculty of Medicine, FMUP
 Faculty of Nutrition and Food Science, FCNAUP
 Faculty of Pharmacy, FFUP
 Faculty of Psychology and Educational Sciences, FPCEUP
 Faculty of Sciences, FCUP 
 Faculty of Sport, FADEUP 
 Institute of Biomedical Sciences Abel Salazar, ICBAS
 Porto Business School, PBS – UP

Globally, the U. Porto offers 63 graduate degree courses, over 160 master courses, and several doctoral degree courses and other specialization courses, supported by 2300 lecturers and a technical and administrative staff of over 1600 people.

Notable alumni and professors
Abel Salazar, doctor, professor, painter.
Agostinho da Silva, philosopher.
Alberto Barros, doctor, professor and influent geneticist.
António Carneiro, painter.
António Pinho Vargas, pianist and composer.
Alexandre Quintanilha, scientist.
Anake Kijjoa, professor and scientist.
António Soares dos Reis, sculptor.
Artur Aguas, professor and scientist.
Belmiro de Azevedo, businessperson.
Berta Nunes, Secretary of State for Portuguese Communities, 2019 to present.
Camilo Castelo Branco, writer.
Corino de Andrade, professor and scientist.
Edgar Cardoso, civil engineer and professor.
Eduardo Souto Moura, architect.
Elisa Ferreira, politician.
Marisa Ferreira, artist.
Fernando Teixeira dos Santos, minister.
Francisco Laranjo, painter and professor.
Froilano de Mello, microbiologist and MP in the Portuguese National Assembly.
José Neves, businessman, founder of Farfetch
Jorge de Sena, poet, writer, professor and translator.
José A.F.O. Correia, engineer and scientist.
José Fernando Ferreira Mendes, professor and scientist.
José Leite de Vasconcelos, doctor, ethnographer, archeologist, philologist, museologist and university teacher.
José Pacheco Pereira, teacher and political analyst.
Júlio Dinis, doctor, writer.
Júlio Pomar, painter.
Kaúlza de Arriaga, Brigadier General, writer, professor and politician.
Leopoldina Ferreira Paulo, anthropologist and the first woman to be awarded a Doctorate by the university
Luís Archer, biologist, epistemologist and professor.
Luís Prista, professor and scientist.
Manuel Sobrinho Simões, professor and scientist.
Marcelo Viana, mathematician
Maria Manuel Mota, professor and biologist.
Mário Sousa, professor and scientist.
Nuno Grande, professor and scientist.
Richard Zimler, professor and writer.
Rómulo de Carvalho / António Gedeão, scientist and poet.
Rui Reininho, musician.
Rui Rio, politician and former mayor of the city of Porto.
Sarah Hoyt, writer.
Sérgio Godinho, musician.
Alvaro Siza, architect.
Teresa Lago, astrophysicist and professor.
Victor de Sá, historian and professor.
Andreas T Salom, Mining Engineer.
Virgínia Moura anti-government activist and feminist, opposed to Estado Novo, second Portuguese woman to qualify as a civil engineer.

See also
 List of modern universities in Europe (1801–1945)
List of universities in Portugal
Higher education in Portugal

Notes and references

External links
University of Porto
Erasmus students reviews of University of Porto

 
Education in Porto
1936 establishments in Portugal